The 2003 Fiordland earthquake struck the remote region of Fiordland in the South Island of New Zealand on 22 August 2003 at 12:12 am NZST. The epicentre was 12 km deep, and was thought to be near Secretary Island at the entrance to Doubtful Sound. At 7.2  magnitude, it was one of the largest quakes in the country for some time, and was the largest shallow quake since the 1968 Inangahua earthquake. There was an aftershock two hours later at 2.12 am, followed over several days by frequent small tremors; by 21 September, there were 6,365 aftershocks.

Fiordland is one of the seismically active parts of the country according to GNS seismologist Dr. Warwick Smith, as they are a relief mechanism for stresses as the Australian and Pacific tectonic plates are being forced together in the area, with the Pacific Plate subducting under the Australian Plate.

In August 2004 there was another large earthquake of magnitude 7.1  in Fiordland. This was the same location as an earthquake of 6.7  magnitude on 10 August 1993.

Damage 
At Te Anau some 70 km to the south-east residents felt the quake strongly and items fell off shelves in shops and homes. Some of the pupils at Te Anau Primary School felt "weird" or "scared".

A team of geologists led by Ian Turnbull went to investigate and reported "landsliding on a large scale". They recorded at least 200 landslides after overflying seventy percent of central and western Fiordland.

See also
List of earthquakes in 2003
List of earthquakes in New Zealand

References

Further reading

External links 

2003 earthquakes
Fiordland earthquake
Earthquakes in New Zealand
History of Southland, New Zealand